The Grand Riviera Theater was a movie palace theater located at 9222 Grand River Avenue in western Detroit, Michigan. It took its name from Grand River Avenue. It was designated a Michigan State Historic Site in 1980, and listed on the National Register of Historic Places in 1982, but was subsequently demolished in June, 1996. The building was removed from the National Register in  2020.

History
The Grand Riviera cinema was built in 1925, at a cost of over one million dollars. It seated over 3000, and was the first "atmospheric" theater in Detroit, using lighting, special effects, and interior design to make the audience feel like they were sitting outdoors in a garden.

The theater was immediately successful, and in 1927 an 1,800 seat annex was built. In 1957, the Riviera was converted to a stage theater. When the Fisher Theater reopened in 1960, however, the Grand Riviera took a back seat. The building was used for music concerts until it closed in the mid-1970s. Afterward, the structure deteriorated, to the point that it was considered unsafe and demolished in 1996.

Description
The Grand Riviera Theater was a three-story structure built from brown brick in an Italian Renaissance Revival and Mediterranean Revival style. An  octagonal pavilion sat on the corner of the structure. The pavilion had arched, multi-paned windows and substantial cream terra cotta decoration.

To the west of the pavilion was the three-story wing with commercial and office space. To the north was the auditorium section which was built with windowless  paneled brick walls.

The interior design and decorations of the Grand Riviera were very ornate. The original "atmospheric" interior elements included a simulated courtyard, a dark blue ceiling with inset electric "stars" and projected moving clouds, and walls with artificial trees and vines.

Gallery

References

External links

 The United States Library of Congress. Free to Use and Reuse: Movie Magic. February 24, 2020 by Neely Tucker.

Movie palaces
Theatres in Detroit
Theatres completed in 1925
Demolished buildings and structures in Detroit
Buildings and structures demolished in 1996
Historic American Buildings Survey in Michigan
Michigan State Historic Sites
National Register of Historic Places in Detroit
Mediterranean Revival architecture in the United States
Renaissance Revival architecture in Michigan
Theatres on the National Register of Historic Places in Michigan
Former National Register of Historic Places in Michigan